Gabriel Hogarth Ford (January 3, 1765 – August 27, 1849) was a soldier, lawyer, and jurist from Morristown, New Jersey. He served in the Continental Army during the American Revolutionary War, and his home served as George Washington's headquarters during part of his time in New Jersey. He ran a prominent law practice after the war and was later appointed judge on the United States District Court.

References
 

1765 births
1849 deaths
American jurists
People from Morristown, New Jersey